Rasahus hamatus, the corsair, is a species of corsair (or  assassin bug) in the family Reduviidae. It is found in the Caribbean, Central America, North America, and South America.

References

Further reading

 
 

Reduviidae
Articles created by Qbugbot
Insects described in 1781